Juan Ignacio Brunet Bordin (born 24 January 1998) is an Argentine footballer who plays as a midfielder for Spanish side Bergantiños.

Club career
Brunet was born in Maipú, Mendoza, and joined Atlético Paranaense's youth setup in 2016, from Godoy Cruz. In July 2018, he moved to Spain with CD Lugo and was initially assigned to the farm team in Tercera División.

Brunet made his senior debut on 9 September 2018, playing 35 minutes in a 0–4 away loss against Racing de Ferrol. He scored his first goal on 11 November, netting his team's fifth in a 5–2 away routing of Ribadumia CF.

On 31 July 2020, Brunet signed a one-year deal with Granada CF, being initially assigned to the reserves in Segunda División B. He made his first team – and La Liga – debut on 8 November, coming on as a second-half substitute for fellow debutant Isma Ruiz in a 0–2 away loss against Real Sociedad, as his side was heavily impacted by the COVID-19 pandemic.

References

External links

1998 births
Living people
People from Maipú, Argentina
Argentine people of French descent
Argentine footballers
Association football midfielders
La Liga players
Tercera División players
Polvorín FC players
Club Recreativo Granada players
Granada CF footballers
Argentine expatriate footballers
Argentine expatriate sportspeople in Spain
Expatriate footballers in Spain
Sportspeople from Mendoza Province